Chubarov is a Slavic masculine surname, its feminine counterpart is Chubarova. Notable people with the surname include:

Artem Chubarov (born 1979), Russian ice hockey player
Refat Chubarov (born 1957), Ukrainian politician

Russian-language surnames